The Alibi is a 2006 American film directed by  Kurt Mattila and Matt Checkowski and written by Noah Hawley. It stars Steve Coogan, Rebecca Romijn, and Selma Blair. The film was shown at 2006 CineVegas. The film was released to DVD on December 5, 2006 under the title Lies and Alibis.

Plot
A man who runs an alibi agency, a service for adulterous husbands and wives that provides airtight alibis, runs into trouble with his latest client. In order to remedy the problem, he has to rely on a very enticing woman, his assistant and partner. The plot thickens when he switches identities with one of his clients for a weekend, and the client's girlfriend dies in an accident. With the police, an assassin, and a jealous ex-boyfriend to run from, he discovers that he will need all the ingenuity he can muster to survive.

Cast
 Steve Coogan as Ray Elliott
 Rebecca Romijn as Lola
 Selma Blair as Adelle
 James Brolin as Robert Hatch
 Sam Elliott as The Mormon
 Jaime King as Heather Price
 John Leguizamo as Hannibal
 James Marsden as Wendell Hatch
 Debi Mazar as Detective Bryce
 Henry Rollins as "Putty"
 Deborah Kara Unger as Dorothy
 Terry Crews as "Crazy Eight"
 Jarreth Merz as The Quiet Man

References

External links
 
 

2006 films
2006 romantic comedy films
American romantic comedy films
Destination Films films
Films with screenplays by Noah Hawley
Films scored by Alexandre Desplat
Summit Entertainment films
2006 directorial debut films
2000s English-language films
2000s American films